The MRWA D class was a class of 4-8-0 type steam locomotives built by Baldwin Locomotive Works in Philadelphia, USA, for the haulage of goods traffic on the Midland Railway of Western Australia (MRWA).

Service history 
The two members of the A class, nos D19 and D20, were ordered in 1919 and completed in 118 working days. They were dismantled, boxed, and shipped on 5 April 1920, before entering service later that year.

Both locomotives survived the dieselisation of the MRWA in 1958 as emergency power. They were written off in April 1963, and scrapped soon afterwards.

See also 

 List of Western Australian locomotive classes
 Locomotives of the Western Australian Government Railways

References

External links

2-8-0 locomotives
Baldwin locomotives
Railway locomotives introduced in 1920
D class
Locomotives of the Midland Railway of Western Australia
3 ft 6 in gauge locomotives of Australia
Scrapped locomotives